The 2000–01 Montreal Canadiens season was the club's 92nd season of play. The club finished 5th in the Northeast Division and did not qualify for the Stanley Cup playoffs. The franchise missed the playoffs for the third consecutive season.

George Gillett
At the end of December, Dan O'Neill, president of Molson met with George N. Gillett, Jr. Gillett had shown interest in the Florida Panthers, New York Islanders, Ottawa Senators, and the Phoenix Coyotes. After the meeting, Gillett agreed to be the new owner. Gillett acquired the Molson Centre and eighty percent of the franchise for two hundred and seventy-five million dollars.

Regular season
 After a loss to the Washington Capitals on November 17, the Canadiens had the worst record in the NHL. The two expansion teams, Minnesota and Columbus were ahead of them in the standings. After losing to the Toronto Maple Leafs on home ice on November 18, Rejean Houle and Alain Vigneault were fired. On November 20, Andre Savard was made the new general manager, while Michel Therrien of the Quebec Citadelles became the new head coach. Despite the changes, the Canadiens had one win, ten losses and two ties in the month of December.
 February 13, 2001: Patrick Roy made his first visit to Montreal since breaking Terry Sawchuk's record for most wins by a goaltender. Roy had won 289 games with Montreal, and the Canadiens held a pregame ceremony for Roy.

The Canadiens allowed the fewest short-handed goals during the regular season, with just 3.

Final standings

Schedule and results

Player statistics

Regular season
Scoring

Goaltending

Awards and records

Transactions

Draft picks
Montreal's draft picks at the 2000 NHL Entry Draft held at the Pengrowth Saddledome in Calgary, Alberta.

See also
 2000–01 NHL season

References
 Canadiens on Hockey Database
 Canadiens on NHL Reference

Montreal Canadiens seasons
Montreal Canadiens season, 2000-01
Montreal